Schneider 2 cells, usually abbreviated as S2 cells, are one of the most commonly used Drosophila melanogaster cell lines. S2 cells were derived from a primary culture of late stage (20–24 hours old) Drosophila melanogaster embryos by Dr. Imogene Schneider, likely from a macrophage-like lineage.

S2 cells can be grown at room temperature both as a semi-adherent monolayer or
in suspension, and they can be grown in the absence of serum.

Several media have been developed for culturing insect cell lines with many of them suitable for culturing S2 cells. The S2 cells have been shown to grow up to 5.1×107 cells/ml in serum free medium and above 107 cells/ml in basal media such as that used in Schneider's experiments. ExpreS2ion Biotechnologies have shown a cell concentration of up 7.0x107 cell/ml.

S2 cells are often used for expression of heterologous proteins and can be used for large-scale production of proteins. Additionally, the cells can be easily transiently transfected with several plasmids at once to study protein interactions.

References

External links
Cellosaurus entry for Schneider 2

Insect cell lines
Drosophila melanogaster